Franco "Thunderbird" Wanyama (7 February 1968 - 21 March 2019) in Kampala, was a Ugandan amateur middleweight and professional cruiser/heavyweight boxer of the 1980s, '90s and 2000s. Wanyama defeated notable fighters such as Jimmy Thunder, Carl Thompson and Johnny Nelson and was sparring partner to Vitali Klitschko & Wladimir Klitschko. He lived his last years in Rugby, Warwickshire, England and had 3 children, Nellie Wanyama, Shannon Wanyama and  Wanga Wanyama.

Early life
Franco started boxing around the age of 6 after becoming curious of what was inside a local boxing gym.

Professional career
Franco made his professional debut on 25 December 1989 against Dutch fighter John Held (7-13-2) it ended a 6-round points draw. In 1990 he beat future world title holder Carl Thompson on points. In 1993 he won a bout against another future world champion, Johnny Nelson, who was disqualified for repeated holding. In 1995 he was matched with former world champion Thomas Hearns but the fight was called off at the last minute and Hearns was replaced by ranked Heavyweight Jimmy Thunder, Wanyama and gave away a 30 pounds in weight but still came away with a points victory.

Later years
After his retirement Franco worked as a sparring partner, notably with the Klitschko brothers. From 2007 he became a youth worker and boxing coach in Rugby, taking classes for the youth service whilst also being a coach at a local amateur boxing gym. On the 21st of March 2019 Franco died at his home in Rugby.

Professional boxing record

References

External links

Image - Franco Wanyama

1968 births
2019 deaths
Boxers at the 1988 Summer Olympics
Cruiserweight boxers
Heavyweight boxers
Olympic boxers of Uganda
Sportspeople from Kampala
Ugandan male boxers
Sportspeople from Rugby, Warwickshire